Alexander Seluyanov (born March 24, 1982) is a Russian professional ice hockey defenceman. He was selected by the Detroit Red Wings in the 4th round (128th overall) of the 2000 NHL Entry Draft.

Seluyanov made his Kontinental Hockey League debut playing with Metallurg Magnitogorsk during the inaugural 2008–09 KHL season.

His younger brother Vyacheslav Seluyanov is also an ice hockey player.

Career statistics

Regular season and playoffs

International

References

External links

Living people
Avtomobilist Yekaterinburg players
HC Dynamo Moscow players
HC Lada Togliatti players
HC Neftekhimik Nizhnekamsk players
HC Yugra players
Metallurg Magnitogorsk players
Russian ice hockey defencemen
Salavat Yulaev Ufa players
Torpedo Nizhny Novgorod players
1982 births
Detroit Red Wings draft picks
Sportspeople from Ufa